is a railway station on the Shinano Railway Line in the city of Ueda, Nagano, Japan, operated by the third-sector railway operating company Shinano Railway.

Lines
Shinano-Kokubunji Station is served by the 65.1 km Shinano Railway Line and is 37.1 kilometers from the starting point of the line at Karuizawa Station.

Station layout
The station consists of two ground-level opposed side platforms serving two tracks, connected to the station building by a footbridge.

Platforms

Adjacent stations

History
The station opened on 29 March 2002.

Passenger statistics
In fiscal 2011, the station was used by an average of 1,114 passengers daily.

Surrounding area
Site of Shinano Kokubun-ji

See also
 List of railway stations in Japan

References

External links
  

Railway stations in Nagano Prefecture
Railway stations in Japan opened in 2002
Shinano Railway Line
Ueda, Nagano